Kuo Yao-chi (born 13 March 1956) is a Taiwanese administrative official who served as former Minister of Transportation and Communications.

Kuo Yao-chi was fascinated in music since childhood and had won the first place of Taoyuan County Junior Piano Competition. Kuo graduated from National Cheng Kung University's Department of Urban Planning; she went to England where she earned her master's degree in Urban Development and the New Town Development from the University of London. Kuo passed the National Higher Examination for Urban Planning and was one of the few excellent female executives from the grassroots in Taiwan.

Kuo started her occupation as an assistant researcher at the Urban Design and Environmental Planning Lab in Tamkang University, a planner in the Taiwan Housing and Urban Development Bureau, senior planner in the Taipei Urban Planning Committee, section chief of the Public Works Bureau, and Information Team Leader. Kuo once handled a major urban planning project, saved more than 260 million NT dollar of public funds for the Taipei City Government and had been awarded an excellent performance by the Taipei City Government. Because of her devotion to work, she was appreciated by colleagues and the major. Kuo was promoted as a secretary general of the Public Works Bureau and after that the first female director general of the Public Housing Department in the Taipei City Government. Kuo had successfully solved sea sand houses, slanted houses, and radiation houses problems. She was reforming public housing rental management system, abolishing unfair manner priority waiting roster, and the first to create leasehold housing for low-income families. In year 2000, Kuo served as a director of Public Affairs of the Presidential Office, minister without portfolio, and chair of the Public Construction Commission of the Executive Yuan in 2002. Meanwhile, she also served as the CEO of the 921 Post-earthquake Disaster Recovery Commission to accelerate the reconstruction works in the aftermath of the 1999 Jiji earthquake (known as the "921 earthquake" in Taiwan). For Kuo's great achievement in recovering and revitalizing the 1999 earthquake disaster areas, she was elected as the Alumni Distinguished Achievement Award of the National Cheng Kung University in 2004.

In year 2006, Kuo served as a minister of the Ministry of Transportation and Communication, Republic of China. One of her great achievement was to complete and officially open the 12.9 km Hsuehshan Tunnel (雪山隧道) -- Asia's longest and the world's fourth-longest. However, she resigned her commission being responsible for the policy of electronic toll collection system (ETC).

Kuo Yao-chi is a devout Buddhist, often participates in the religious and social welfare activities, such as continuing to care the Xiao-lin Village reconstruction, assist surviving families’ livelihoods, initiated "School Nest” volunteer activities, and involving herself as a volunteer teacher. She brings the community together to care for children of low-income families in Tataocheng (大稻埕) area. Currently she is also caring for elderly parents with dementia..

Controversy

After Kuo leaving office, she was accused of receiving a bribe of US$20,000 by the prosecutors who monitoring chair of Nan Ren Hu Lee Ching-po (李清波) telling to his son Lee Tsung-hsien (李宗賢) to present two cans of tea to Kuo, and putting US$20,000 to help Kuo's son studying abroad on the phone call in 2006.

The Supreme Court upheld the conviction handed down by the Taiwan High Court in March, which found Kuo guilty of accepting a bribe related to using her position as transportation minister to grant favors to the Nan Ren Hu Group, a service industry conglomerate, even though she had been found not guilty in first and second trials in 2009 and 2010 respectively.

"I have never received bribes... A reputation is not earned in one or two days. I have spent my entire career as a public servant building a good reputation. All my associates know I am not someone who can be bribed," Kuo told a press conference in Taipei.

The former minister held a press conference insisting on her innocence. Kuo was accompanied by her lawyers Wellington Ku (顧立雄) and Li Yung-ran (李永然), as well as Taipei mayoral aspirant Dr. Ko Wen-je (柯文哲) and others. They all claimed the conviction was flawed because of insufficient evidence and inconsistent testimony from Lee Tsung-hsien, son of Nan Ren Hu chairman Lee Ching-po. They said they would sue Lee Tsung-hsien for perjury and request a retrial and an extraordinary appeal.

Lee Tsung-hsien testified that he had been asked by his father to deliver the cash, but he gave inconsistent information about the numbers, color and material of the tea gift boxes that contained the US$20,000 and were allegedly delivered to Kuo, at first saying that the cash was placed in two iron tea boxes.

He revoked his deposition after Kuo submitted a red tea box, which prosecutors failed to find in a raid of her house, and subsequently said that there was only one cardboard tea box.
 
The Ministry of Justice's Investigation Bureau later canceled Lee Tsung-hsien's original testimony, Koo said.

"In other words, Kuo’s conviction was upheld with inconsistent testimony and without any substantial evidence because no cash was never found — not in the tea box nor in any of Kuo’s or her family’s bank accounts," Koo said. "I'm wondering if the judicial system applies a different set of standard for DPP politicians and government officials who served under the DPP administration."

The opposition Democratic Progressive Party's regular weekly Central Standing Committee meeting concluded with a call for a new review of the case to give Kuo an opportunity to clear her name, and voiced its support for former Transportation Minister Kuo Yao-chi.

The DPP motion praised Kuo's performance in office during the administration of President Chen Shui-bian from 2000 to 2008 and warned against the political exploitation of the judiciary against the opposition in the run-up to the December 6, 2014 local elections.

Kuo appeared at a separate news conference earlier where she pleaded her innocence and received the support of former Cabinet colleagues and opposition activists.

Former DPP Chairwoman Tsai Ing-wen also released a statement supporting Kuo's case for judicial redress.

References

Taiwan News,Kuo Yao-chi continues to proclaim innocence of bribery charges, Dec 8, 2013
The China Post,Sentenced ex-transport minister mulling extraordinary appeal, Dec 9, 2013
Taipei Times,Fairness in judiciary essential to democracy, Dec 21, 2013
Taipei Times,Kuo corruption case shows judiciary ‘barbaric’: experts, Dec 27, 2013
Taipei Times,Ex-minister Kuo vows to clear name, Jan 09, 2014

Living people
Taiwanese Buddhists
Taiwanese Ministers of Transportation and Communications
1956 births
Politicians of the Republic of China on Taiwan from Hualien County
Alumni of the University of London
Taiwanese politicians convicted of bribery
Women government ministers of Taiwan